Route 903, or Highway 903, may refer to:

Canada
Saskatchewan Highway 903

Costa Rica
 National Route 903

United Kingdom
 A903 road

United States